The 2018 Mid-American Conference women's basketball tournament was a post-season basketball tournament for the Mid-American Conference (MAC) 2017–18 college basketball season. Tournament first round games was held on campus sites at the higher seed on March 5. The remaining rounds was held at Quicken Loans Arena in Cleveland between March 7–10. Central Michigan won the MAC Women's Tournament received the conference's automatic bid into the 2018 NCAA tournament.

Format
Unlike with the recent tournaments, where the top two seeds received byes into the semifinals, with the three and four seeds receiving a bye to the quarterfinals, the tournament will revert to its original structure in which the top four seeds receive just one bye into the quarterfinals.

Seeds

Schedule

Bracket

First round games at campus sites of lower-numbered seeds

All-Tournament Team
Tournament MVP – Reyna Frost, Central Michigan

See also
2018 MAC men's basketball tournament

References

External links

Mid-American Conference women's basketball tournament
2017–18 Mid-American Conference women's basketball season
2018 in sports in Ohio
Basketball competitions in Cleveland
College basketball tournaments in Ohio
Women's sports in Ohio
2010s in Cleveland